Årets Näck (The Year's Nix) is an annual competition to select the year's incarnation of the Näcken or Nix, a male fairy creature in Sweden. The competition takes place at the Tannery Holmen located in Billstaån, Hackås, Bergs kommun, in southern Jämtland. The contest is part of "Hackås Days" (Hackåsdagarna) festival organized by the Hackås District Foundation.

The contestants for the Årets Näck title compete by sitting or standing in the river while virtually nude and playing an instrument (typically the violin) in order to portray the Nix. Participants have also competed a cappella, on drum, or on accordion.

In 2009, the competition was atypically won by a saxophone player, Martin Norberg.

Rules of the competition
 The competition is open only to male musicians.
 The contestant may only cover himself with things that he can find in nature.
 A musical work will be played by each participant, either a traditional piece or newly composed. It should be performed on a "magically" tuned violin.
 The order of competitors will be decided by a random drawing at the music cafe at Strömbacka Mill prior to the contest.
 A three-man jury of two people skilled in folk music and a non-folk-musician female judge score the contestants according to the following criteria: musical performance, charisma and convincingness. After deliberation the jury announces the results, which can not be appealed.
 The winner receives a priceless handwritten certificate and SEK 2,000 (increased from 2004).
 The winner of each of the three selection criteria receives SEK 500 in premiums (in 1998).
 Since 2004, there has also been a crowd's prize awarded of SEK 500.
Source:

Past winners

Related
On April 23, 2010, Olle af Klintberg appeared on TV4's Talang, Sweden's "Got Talent" show. In that episode, when the curtains opened, Olle was portraying the Näcken by sitting on a rock with blue cloth on the floor to represent water, and water lilies placed around the stone and in his hair. He played the violin and sang a verse from Näcken, a poem by Erik Johan Stagnelius. Judges Bert Karlsson and Charlotte Perrelli voted against Olle, while Johan Pråmell voted for him.

References

Music television specials
Music competitions in Sweden